Supernatural Addiction is an album by the thrash metal/death metal band Deceased. It was their last full-length album on Relapse Records.

Production
The album was produced by Simon Efemey. Each song was inspired by a different horror tale, movie, or show.

Critical reception
AllMusic wrote that Deceased "temper their death-metal fury with a love for old-school thrash, which actually works well for them, keeping the music from getting too cartoonish." CMJ New Music Report wrote that "[King] Fowley proudly and loudly prefers the glory days of superfast metal, when patches on acid-washed denim jackets reigned supreme and there was no rap or glam in sight."

Track listing

Inspirations
The Twilight Zone, episode "Twenty-Two" (written by Rod Serling)
"The Tell-Tale Heart" (written by Edgar Allan Poe)
Famous Ghost Stories, segment "The Hitchhiker" (written by Oscar Brand)
Asylum, segment "Frozen Fear" (written by Robert Bloch)
Trilogy of Terror, segment "Amelia" (written by Richard Matheson)
An Occurrence at Owl Creek Bridge (written by Ambrose Bierce)
Tales from the Crypt, segment "Blind Alley" (written by William Gaines)The Blair Witch Project'' (written by Daniel Myrick and Eduardo Sanchez)

Credits
King Fowley - Drums, Vocals, Keyboards
Mike Smith - Guitars
Mark Adams - Guitars
Les Snyder - Bass

Other Credits
Mike Bossier - Engineer
Simon Efemey - Producer, Keyboards on "Elly's Dementia"
Jessica Scott - Voice on "A Very Familiar Stranger" 
Allen Koszowski - Cover Art
Jason Van Hollander - Cover Art Coloring
Eric Horst - Cover Art Coloring
Flo Homer - Photos

References

Deceased (band) albums
2000 albums